Natasia Charlotte Demetriou is an English comedian, actress, and screenwriter. She is best known for her roles as Nadja in the FX horror comedy series What We Do in the Shadows (2019–present) and Sophie in the Channel 4 sitcom Stath Lets Flats (2018–2021).

In 2022, Natasia co-wrote and starred in the BBC sketch show, Ellie & Natasia, alongside her comedy partner Ellie White.

Early life
Natasia Charlotte Demetriou was born in London, the daughter of an English mother and a Greek-Cypriot father. She was raised in North London. Her younger brother, Jamie Demetriou, is a comedian and actor with whom she often collaborates. She studied acting at University of Leeds. Prior to becoming a professional comedian, Demetriou worked as a makeup artist, notably working on music videos for Boy Better Know.

Career
Demetriou's debut show, You'll Never Have All of Me, won the Skinny Debutant Award at the 2014 Edinburgh Festival Fringe. She was a longtime member of sketch comedy troupe Oyster Eyes and has written for Anna & Katy and The Midnight Beast. Demetriou made her TV debut in 2013. In 2015, she was in the comedy sketch show pilot of People Time on BBC Three with Ellie White, alongside her brother Jamie Demetriou, with Claudia O’Doherty, Liam Williams, Alistair Roberts and Daran Johnson.

In 2018 she played sister to her real life brother Jamie Demetriou's Stath in Channel 4 sitcom, Stath Lets Flats, about a family-run estate agents, which was written and created by her brother. On 11 May 2020, a special "lockdown" mini-episode was released online due to the COVID-19 pandemic. At the 2020 BAFTA awards Stath Lets Flats won three awards: Best Male Actor in a comedy, Best Writer of a Comedy, and Best Scripted Comedy.

In 2019, Demetriou also starred in and wrote the highly acclaimed BBC Three comedy sketch show Ellie & Natasia, a show inspired by social anxiety and being a woman in today's society, with Ellie White. In March 2020, it was reported that BBC commissioned a six-episode series, but it was delayed due to the COVID-19 pandemic.

Since March 2019, Demetriou has starred as Nadja, a Greek Romani vampire, in the critically acclaimed FX horror comedy series What We Do in the Shadows. The series was created by Jemaine Clement and Taika Waititi, based upon their 2014 film of the same name. The mockumentary follows three vampires (Laszlo, Nadja, and Nandor) living in a house in Staten Island and trying to cope with modern-day New York City, along with an energy vampire (Colin) and Nandor's human familiar (Guillermo). The show co-stars Kayvan Novak, Matt Berry, Harvey Guillén and Mark Proksch. The second season of ten episodes debuted in April 2020.

Starting 18 May 2020, Demetriou and Vic Reeves co-hosted Netflix's unscripted reality competition show The Big Flower Fight. The eight-part series sees 10 pairs of contestants in a knockout competition featuring huge flower installations with the winner going on to design an installation to be displayed in London's Royal Botanic Gardens, Kew.

In 2021, Demetriou was a series regular on the second series of This Time with Alan Partridge, portraying a flirtatious makeup artist named Tiff.

Personal life
Demetriou lives in North London with her dogs. Her hobbies include gardening.

Filmography

Film

Television

Theatre

Awards and nominations

References

External links 
 

21st-century British actresses
Alumni of the University of Leeds
English people of Greek Cypriot descent
English television actresses
English women comedians
Living people
Actresses from London
People from the London Borough of Camden
Cypriot actresses
21st-century English women
21st-century English people
1984 births